Haryana Tourism Corporation (HTC) was constituted as a Public Limited Company under the Companies Act, 1956 on 1 May 1974. As an agent of the Government of Haryana, Haryana Tourism Corporation runs and maintains 44 Tourist Complexes spread across the state of Haryana. These Tourist Complexes offer visitors lodging, dining, recreational activities, Restaurant, Bars, Liquor Vends, Tourist taxis, Petrol Pumps, Swimming Pool, Health Club, Golf Club, Lakes, boating, etc.

Haryana Tourism also organises and hosts Surajkund International Crafts Mela which is held in Faridabad 20 km away from Delhi every year in the first fortnight of February.

Objectives
 To promote Haryana as a leading tourist destination
 To identify key tourist destinations within Haryana and promote it outside.
 To provide auxiliary support in developing key tourist destinations.
 To provide the highest quality hospitality services to tourists.
 To broaden and diversify the concept of tourism from Highway Tourism to Eco Tourism, Adventure Tourism, Pilgrim Tourism, Farm Tourism, Golf Tourism, Medical Tourism and Heritage Tourism etc. in order to meet new market requirements.
 To ensure higher returns to government, through financial and social viable projects, and thereby provide employment.

Tourism Experience

HTC runs and maintains more than 44 properties ranging from a luxury hotel to heritage resorts and budget accommodation. The HTC Tourist Complexes are named after local birds and are in close harmony with nature.

Highway Tourism

 Parakeet Resort, Pipli, Kurukshetra district
 Karna Resort, Karna Lake, Karnal district
 Oasis Fast Food, Karna Lake, Karnal district
 Skylark Tourist Resort, Panipat
 Ethnic India Tourist Resort, Rai, Sonipat district
 Dabchick Resort, Dabchick Lake, Hodal, Palwal district

Weekend Tourism
Most of the Haryana Tourism Corporation (HTC) resorts at these following Tourist Complexes are designed to cater to business and upper-segment family market.

 Hotel Rajhans', Surajkund Lake, Faridabad
 Lake View Huts, Surajkund Lake, Faridabad
 Sunbird Resort, Surajkund Lake, Faridabad
 Hermitage Huts Resort, Surajkund Lake, Faridabad
 Badkal Resort, Badkhal Lake, Faridabad
 Tilyar Resort, Tilyar Lake, Rohtak
 Barbet Resort, Sohna Hot Water Health Springs, Gurgaon
 Saras Resort, Damdama Lake, Damdama, Gurgaon
 Sultanpur Resort, Sultanpur National Park, Gurgaon
 Blue Bird Resort, Blue Bird Lake, Hisar
 Mountain Quail Resort, Morni, Panchkula district (Near Chandigarh)
 Tikkar Taal, Village Tikkar, Panchkula district (Near Chandigarh)

Heritage Tourism
Most of the Haryana Tourism Corporation (HTC) tourist resorts at these following heritage sites is designed to cater to business and family market segment. 

 Haryanvi cinema
 Haryanvi culture
 Haryanvi folk dances
 Haryanvi language
 Haryanvi music
 Haryanvi people
 Haryanvi Raagni
 Haryanvi saang
 List of Haryanvi-language films
 Pinjore Gardens at Pinjore in Panchkula district
 Nahar Singh Mahal at Ballabgarh in Faridabad

Cultural practices:
 Chowk poorana
 Ragni
 Saang

Pilgrim Tourism
Most of the Haryana Tourism Corporation (HTC) tourist resorts at these following heritage sites is designed to cater to pilgrim segment. 

 Anjan Yatrika, Pehowa, Kurukshetra district -  from Chandigarh
 Phalgu Tirth, Pharal, Kaithal district -  from Chandigarh 
 Neelkanthi Krishna Dham Yatri Niwas, Kurukshetra -  from Delhi
 Jatayu Yatrika, Mata Mansa Devi Mandir, Panchkula -  from Chandigarh

Gallery

See also

 List of Monuments of National Importance in Haryana
 List of State Protected Monuments in Haryana
 List of Indus Valley Civilization sites
 List of National Parks & Wildlife Sanctuaries of Haryana, India
 Surajkund hot spring
 Anagpur Dam - 2 km from Surajkund
 Asigarh Fort at hansi
 Tosham rock inscription at Tosham

References

http://haryanatourism.gov.in/showpage.aspx?contentid=5457#experience=Highway Tourism

External links

Official website
 HarSamadhan Haryana Govt's online Complaints portal 

1974 establishments in Haryana
Tourism in Haryana
State agencies of Haryana
State tourism development corporations of India
Government agencies established in 1974